New York's 110th State Assembly district is one of the 150 districts in the New York State Assembly. It has been represented by Phillip Steck since 2013.

Geography 
District 110 contains portions of Albany and Schenectady counties. It contains the outskirts of the cities of Albany and Troy and a portion of the city of Schenectady.

Recent election results

2022

2020

2018

2016

2014

2012

References

110
Albany County, New York
Schenectady County, New York